Highfield-Cascade is a census-designated place (CDP) in Washington County, Maryland, United States. The CDP encompasses two closely-spaced unincorporated communities, Highfield and Cascade, which are usually referred to separately. The population of the combined CDP was 1,141 at the 2000 census.

Geography
Highfield-Cascade is located at  (39.716692, −77.490887).

Demographics

At the 2000 census there were 1,141 people, 440 households, and 315 families living in the CDP. The racial makeup of the CDP was 69.42% White, 28.18% African American, 0.44% Native American, 0.18% Asian, 0.09% Pacific Islander, and 0.70% from two or more races. Hispanic or Latino of any race were 1.61%.

Of the 440 households 34.3% had children under the age of 18 living with them, 56.8% were married couples living together, 9.3% had a female householder with no husband present, and 28.2% were non-families. 24.1% of households were one person and 9.5% were one person aged 65 or older. The average household size was 2.59 and the average family size was 3.07.

The age distribution was 26.9% under the age of 18, 6.4% from 18 to 24, 33.7% from 25 to 44, 21.3% from 45 to 64, and 11.7% 65 or older. The median age was 36 years. For every 100 females, there were 99.8 males. For every 100 females age 18 and over, there were 99.0 males.

The median household income was $35,833 and the median family income  was $53,036. Males had a median income of $32,813 versus $26,106 for females. The per capita income for the CDP was $18,969. About 5.2% of families and 5.1% of the population were below the poverty line, including 4.1% of those under age 18 and 14.6% of those age 65 or over.

References

Census-designated places in Washington County, Maryland
Census-designated places in Maryland